Megachilidae is a cosmopolitan family of mostly solitary bees. Characteristic traits of this family are the restriction of their pollen-carrying structure (called a scopa) to the ventral surface of the abdomen (rather than mostly or exclusively on the hind legs as in other bee families), and their typically elongated labrum.  Megachilid genera are most commonly known as mason bees and leafcutter bees, reflecting the materials from which they build their nest cells (soil or leaves, respectively); a few collect plant or animal hairs and fibers, and are called carder bees, while others use plant resins in nest construction and are correspondingly called resin bees. All species feed on nectar and pollen, but a few are kleptoparasites (informally called "cuckoo bees"), feeding on pollen collected by other megachilid bees. Parasitic species do not possess scopae.  The motion of Megachilidae in the reproductive structures of flowers is energetic and swimming-like; this agitation releases large amounts of pollen.

Life cycle

Nonparasitic species

Nonparasitic Megachilidae typically divide their nests into cells. Each cell receives a supply of food (pollen or a pollen/nectar mix) and an egg; after finding a suitable spot (often near where she emerged), a female starts building a first cell, stocks it, and oviposits. She builds a wall that separates the completed cell from the next one. The larva hatches from the egg and consumes the food supply. After moulting a few times, it spins a cocoon and pupates. It emerges from the nest as an adult. Males die shortly after mating, but females survive for another few weeks, during which they build new nests.

Nests are often  built in natural or artificial cavities. Some embed individual cells in a mass of clay or resin attached to a wall, rock surface, or plant stem. Nest cavities are often linear, for example in hollow plant stems, but not always (snail shells are used by some Osmia, and some species readily use irregular cavities).

Parasitic species

Some genera of megachilids are brood parasites, so have no ventral scopa (e.g. Stelis and Coelioxys). They often parasitize related taxa. They typically enter the nest before it is sealed and lay their eggs in a cell. After hatching, the parasite larva kills the host larva, unless the female parasite has already done so, and then consumes the provisions. Parasitic species are of equal size or smaller than their victims. In 1921, the journal American Museum Novitates published a preliminary report on parasitic megachilid bees of the western United States.

Diversity

North America has an estimated 630 different megachilid species, including Megachile, Osmia, Anthidium, Hoplitis, and Chalicodoma. Most Megachilidae are native, and a few are introduced, accidentally and intentionally; globally the number of species identified exceeds 4,000. Thus Megachilidae represent 15% to 20% of named species of bees.

The scientific name Megachilidae refers to the genus Megachile, translating roughly as large lipped (Ancient Greek μέγᾰς (mégas, "big") + χεῖλος (kheîlos, "lip"); their "large lips" and strong jaws are well-suited for collection of nest building materials.

Most Megachilidae build their nests in above-ground cavities; they all are solitary bees.  Their nesting habits means that in some studies of bee diversity, this bee family is most likely to be the one encountered, even though the many ground nesting bees are much greater in species numbers (~70% of all bee species are ground nesters). For example, in Krombein's trap-nesting survey (1967), almost all bees that nested in his offerings were Megachilid species—40 of 43 occupying bee species.  (They were outnumbered in diversity by almost twice as many species of wasps (75) that utilized the nests).

Because they are (mostly) above-ground nesters and more commonly attracted to artificial nests, megachilid bees are also more commonly cultivated than ground nesting solitary bees.  They accept nesting materials made from hollow stems, tubes, and blocks with preformed holes ("nest blocks"), and several megachilids have become important species for agricultural / horticultural pollination.  In North America these cultivated bees include the introduced Megachile rotundata, (alfalfa leafcutter bees), used extensively in alfalfa pollination, and the western native and frequently raised  Osmia lignaria (the orchard mason bee or blue orchard bee), used in orchard pollination.  Other Osmia and Megachile species are also in commercial use in North America, Europe and Asia.

A suite of megachilid rely on plant resins for nest construction.  These "resin bees" are typically smaller than honey bees, and effective pollinators, although the hard glue-like resins can complicate management of other tunnel nesting bees.  Carder bees, Anthidium, are unique for using plant fibers; there are 80 to 90 species of them in North America. Ironically, a non-native is best known—A. manicatum, the European wool carder bee, was accidentally introduced to the Americas in the late '60s and has now spread across the continent. It has been described as "... perhaps the most widely distributed unmanaged bee species in the world." Like most Anthidium, rather than cutting leaves or petals, A. manicatum scrapes the hairs from leaves to use for nesting material. It is atypical because the male is larger than the female and constantly on patrol, protecting a "harem" by chasing and even attacking all interlopers including honey and bumble bees, its tail equipped with multiple prongs that can knife in between the segments of almost any intruder.

Neither the introduced Anthidium nor its American cousins are considered parasites, only territorial and at times aggressive, though some genera are, including Coelioxys (kleptoparasites mostly of leafcutter bees), and Stelis (kleptoparasites of leafcutter and mason bees).

While some Megachilidae are extensively studied for their commercial possibilities (or impacts), others are studied by naturalists. Chalicodoma mason bees, not commonly cultivated, are known through extended observation and writings in the last half of the 19th century by Jean-Henri Fabre, with his writings made further famous by his English translator Alexander Teixeira de Mattos ("The Mason Bee"); Fabre wrote many observations, including of other Megachilidae, from his home in France, and his writings inspired many future researchers and enthusiasts, from Charles Darwin to Gerald Durrell. Chalicodoma typically uses grit rather than mud in nest construction, along with other differences.

Evolution and taxonomy

The fossil record for megachilid bees is poor, but a Middle Eocene dicotyledonous leaf shows definite semicircular cutouts along its margin, implying that leaf-cutting bees existed at that time. Multiply-cut leaves and rare body fossils from the Eocene of Germany and the Paleocene of France suggest that Megachilinae began cutting leaves early in their evolution. Phylogenetic analysis yields an age consistent with this Eocene origin for the group.

Subfamily Fideliinae
Tribe Pararhophitini
Pararhophites
Tribe Fideliini
Fidelia
Neofidelia
Subfamily Megachilinae
Tribe Lithurgini
Lithurgus
Microthurge
Trichothurgus
Tribe Osmiini
Afroheriades
Ashmeadiella
Atoposmia
Bekilia
Chelostoma
Haetosmia
Heriades species have narrow abdominal bands. They resemble small Osmia, but they are oligolectic (specialized on a few subfamilies of Asteraceae) and use resin from conifers, as well as plant fibers and sand, as cell wall material.
Hofferia
Hoplitis
Hoplosmia
Noteriades
Ochreriades
Osmia
Othinosmia
Protosmia
Pseudoheriades
Stenoheriades
Stenosmia
Wainia
Xeroheriades
Tribe Anthidiini
Acedanthidium
Afranthidium
Afrostelis
Anthidiellum
Anthidioma
Anthidium
Anthodioctes
Apianthidium
Aspidosmia
Austrostelis
Aztecanthidium
Bathanthidium
Benanthis
Cyphanthidium
Dianthidium
Duckeanthidium
Eoanthidium
Epanthidium
Euaspis
Hoplostelis
Hypanthidioides
Hypanthidium
Icteranthidium
Indanthidium
Larinostelis
Notanthidium
Pachyanthidium
Paranthidium
Plesianthidium
Pseudoanthidium
Rhodanthidium
Serapista
Stelis Panzer and related genera (stelidine bees) are kleptoparasites on other Megachilidae. They belong to the tribe Anthidiini. Bees in the subgenus Heterostelis are parasitic on Trachusa.
Trachusa
Trachusoides
Xenostelis
Tribe Dioxyini
Aglaoapis
Allodioxys
Dioxys is a brood parasite of Megachile, Anthidium, and Osmia.
Ensliniana
Eudioxys
Metadioxys
Paradioxys
Prodioxys
Tribe Megachilini
Coelioxys is a brood parasite of Megachile. Females have a pointed conic abdominal apex (tip); males have several spikes on their apices.
Megachile
Radoszkowskiana
incertae sedis
Neochalicodoma
Stellenigris

References

External links

 Palaearctic Osmiine Bees
 Leafcutting bees on the UF / IFAS Featured Creatures Web site
 Online Guides to all the eastern North American Megachilidae
 Bugguide. Information and photos of Megachilidae of North America

 
Bee families

Cenozoic insects
Extant Eocene first appearances